Paiboon Suwannakudt (1925–1982) was a Thai artist.

Biography
Paiboon was born in 1925. He received his early education from Prachanukul School, Missionary Sevenday Adventis, and Benjamamaharaj School. Later, he attended the School of Arts and Crafts and received a Diploma in Painting and Sculpture from Silpakorn University. He was one of the students of Silpa Bhirasri at the university.

During his career, he also taught at the Sirisart School for two years.

He died in 1982. His daughter, Phaptawan Suwannakudt, is also an artist based in Australia.

References

1925 births
1982 deaths
Thai artists